Daniela Kolářová (born 21 September 1946 in Cheb) is a Czech actress.

She has appeared in several Theatre Studio DVA productions.

Filmography

Film 
 Kawasaki's Rose (2009)
 Vratné lahve (2007) ... Eliška
 Tmavomodrý svět (2001) ... Haniččina matka
 Oběti a vrazi (2000) ... matka
 Cesta z města (2000) ... matka Markéty
 V erbu lvice (1994) ... Anežka
 Akumulátor 1 (1993) ... Marta Fišárková
 Obecná škola (1991) ... Maxová
 Horká kaše (1988) ... Adamová
 Případ se psem (1988)
 Jsi falešný hráč (1986) ... Peterková
 ..a zase ta Lucie (1984) ... maminka
 Lucie, postrach ulice (1984) ... maminka
 Babičky dobíjejte přesně! (1983) ... Loudová
 Pod nohama nebe (1983) ... Darina
 Pytláci (1981) ... Františka
 Ta chvíle, ten okamžik (1981) ... Helena Kodetová
 Brontosaurus (1980) ... Bižoléčára
 Kulový blesk (1978) ... Knotková
 Sneh pod nohami (1978) ... Zuza Melichová
 Setkání v červenci (1978) ... Klára
 Léto s kovbojem (1976) ... Doubravka
 Na samotě u lesa (1976) ... Lavičková
 Muž z Londýna (1974) ... Sýkorova milenka
 Noc na Karlštejně (1973) ... Alena
 Na kolejích čeká vrah (1970) ... Dvorská
 Slasti Otce vlasti (1969) ... Blanka z Valois
 Soukromá vichřice (1967) ... Bohunka Augustová

Television 
 Ulice (2006-2007) (TV serial)
 Černá karta (2005)
 Návrat zbloudilého pastýře (2004)
 PF 77 (2003)
 Nemocnice na kraji města po dvaceti letech (2003) (TV serial)
 Můj otec a ostatní muži (2003)
 Muž, který vycházel z hrobu (2001)
 Jabloňová panna (1999)
 Ohrada snů (1998)
 Na lavici obžalovaných justice (1998) (TV seriál) ... Zdena Šípová - 3,
 Báječný lázeňský život (1997)
 Lékárníkových holka (1996) (TV serial)
 Poprask na laguně (1996)
 Dobrodružství kriminalistiky IV. (1992) (TV serial) ... 22. - Holly Hobdayová
 Bylinková princezna (1991)
 Volavka (1991)
 Veselé příhody z natáčení (1988)
 O perníkové chaloupce (1987)
 Ohnivé ženy se vracejí (1986) ... lékařka
 Synové a dcery Jakuba skláře (1986) (TV serial)
 Zlá krev (1986) (TV seriál) ... Marie
 My všichni školou povinní (1984) (TV serial)
 Doktor z vejminku (1982 ) (TV serial)
 V zámku a podzámčí (1981)
 Dopis psaný španělsky (1980)
 Kotva u přívozu (1980)
 Lucie, postrach ulice (1980) (serial)
 Nebožtíci na bále (1979)
 Dnes v jednom domě (1979) (serial)
 Otec nebo bratr (1978)
 Smrt císaře a krále Karla IV. (1978)
 Závist naším domem vládne (1978)
 Nemocnice na kraji města (1977 - 1980) (TV serial) ... Kateřina Sovová (manželka Sovy ml.)
 Žena za pultem (1977) (TV seriál) ... Soňa
 Podnájemníci (1976)
 Králův kalich (1976)
 Lesní ženka (1976)
 30 případů majora Zemana (1974) (TV serial)
 Klícka (1971) ... Venda
 Taková normální rodinka (1971) (serial) ... Kateřina
 Drobínek (1970)
 Sňatky z rozumu (1968) (serial) ... 4. díl - Marie
 Konec velké epochy (1966)

References

External links

1946 births
Czech film actresses
Czech television actresses
Czech stage actresses
People from Cheb
Living people
20th-century Czech actresses
21st-century Czech actresses
Academy of Performing Arts in Prague alumni